Barhait Assembly constituency is an assembly constituency in  the Indian state of Jharkhand.

Overview
Barhait Assembly constituency covers: Barhait and Ranga Police Stations in Sahebganj district; and Sundarpahari Police Station and Rajabhita, Kero, Kairasol, Bara Telo and Barapipra gram panchayats in Boarijar Police station in Godda district.

This seat is reserved for Scheduled Tribes.

Barhait Assembly constituency is part of Rajmahal (Lok Sabha constituency).

Members of Legislative Assembly

Election results

See also
Barhait (community development block)
Boarijore
Sunderpahari
List of states of India by type of legislature

References

Assembly constituencies of Jharkhand